Four Upbuilding Discourses (1843) is a book by Søren Kierkegaard.

History
Kierkegaard writes these discourses because he's not sure that the other two have done their job. He revisits the story of Job once more but here he puts the emphasis not on what he said but what he did. He "traced everything back to God; he did not detain his soul and quench his spirit with deliberation or explanations that only feed and foster doubt."

He then has two discourses, each with the same title as one of his first discourses, in which he wrote about God's perfect gifts from above. In that discourse he had said, "if a person is to be able to find peace in these words in his lifetime, he must be able to decide either what it is that comes from God or what may legitimately and truly be termed a good and perfect gift. But how is this possible? Is every human life, then, a continuous chain of miracles? Or is it possible for a human being's understanding to make it through the incalculable series of secondary causes and effects, to penetrate everything in between, and in that way to find God? Or is it possible for a human being's understanding to decide with certainty what is a good and perfect gift from him? Does it not run aground on this again and again?" He explores the kind of knowledge that is necessary for an individual to determine, with certainty, that he has this good and perfect gift.

His last discourse is about the battle between God and the world for the soul of every single individual. According to Kierkegaard the only weapon needed to fight this battle is patience. This battle is not an external battle against external enemies but entirely internal. Heiberg reviewed these discourses and remarked that the first discourse in this series was the only one of his eighteen discourses that seemed like a sermon, the rest seemed too philosophical in nature and Kierkegaard agreed with him.

Structure 
 The Lord Gave, and the Lord Took Away; Blessed Be the Name of the Lord. (Job 1:20-21)
 Every Good Gift and Every Perfect Gift Is from Above (James 1:17-22)
 Every Good Gift and Every Perfect Gift Is from Above
 To Gain One's Soul in Patience

The Lord Gave, and the Lord Took Away; Blessed Be the Name of the Lord
Kierkegaard explores two simple verses from the Old Testament, "Then Job arose, and tore his robe, and shaved his head, and fell upon the ground, and worshiped, saying: Naked I came from my mother's womb, and naked shall I return; the Lord gave, and the Lord took away; blessed be the name of the Lord.", and delivers a message to his "reader" about gratitude.

The Young Man from Repetition found in Job a reason to argue not only with the whole world but also with God, he said, "Job's tormented soul breaks forth in powerful cries. Then I understand; these words I make my own. At the same time, I sense the contradiction and smile at myself as one smiles at a little child who has donned his father's clothes. Indeed, is it not something to smile at if anyone else but Job would say: Alas, if only a man could take God to court as a child of man does his fellow. And yet anxiety comes over me, as if I still did not understand what someday I would come to understand, as if the horror I was reading about was waiting for me, as if by reading about it I brought it upon myself, just as one becomes ill with the sickness one reads about."

The Young Man had a woman who loved him and was unable to withstand the peer pressure of his age. Job had everything he had taken away from him and the only thing he said was, "The Lord gave", he didn't get angry with God. The Young Man was concerned about the external world but Kierkegaard is interested in the internal world of the spirit where hope endures.

In the external world the flesh wants to have what it had before. An individual gets power over others and uses it wisely or continually craves more power. If this repetition is kept up that individual becomes a tyrant. Kierkiegaard says, "What his soul delighted in, it now thirsted for, and ingratitude punished him by picturing it to him as more delightful than it had ever been." If Johannes the Seducer wants to seduce another woman, Kierkegaard says, "What he once had been able to do, he now wanted to be able to do again, and ingratitude punished him with fantasies that had never had any truth. Then he condemned his soul, living, to be starved out in the insatiable craving of the lack (of money, power, adoration, alcohol, drugs, etc..) How can this craving be stopped? Only by choosing the ethical life-view, according to Kierkegaard. He says the unhappiest person is the one who has the "content of his life, the fullness of his consciousness, the essence of his being, in some manner outside of himself" because this becomes a "rigid limitation".

Kierkegaard presents Job as the prototype that follows one generation after another.  He knew the Lord had taken everything away and didn't even go out to attack the Sabaeans who had cut down his herds and their keepers. He traced everything back to God. Kierkegaard asks, "does he alone see God's hand who sees that he gives, or does not one also see God's hand who sees that he takes away?" Job says, "How powerless the assailant's arm, how worthless the schemer's cleverness; how almost pitiable is all human power when it wants to plunge the weak person into despairing submission by wrenching everything from him and in his faith he says: it is not you, you can do nothing, it is the Lord who takes away. Blessed be the name of the Lord!"

        
The moral of the story is directed not to his "reader" but to his "listener".

Every Good Gift and Every Perfect Gift Is from Above 
This discourse is based on the following 6 verses from the Epistle of James, "Every good gift and every perfect gift is from above and comes down from the Father of lights, with whom there is no change or shadow of variation. According to his own counsel, he brought us forth by the word of truth, that we should be a first fruit of creation. Therefore, my beloved brethren, let every person be quick to hear, slow to speak, slow to anger, because a man's anger does not work what is righteous before God. Therefore put away all filthiness and all remnants of wickedness and receive with meekness the word that is implanted in you and that is powerful in making your souls blessed." James 1:17-22

 He begins with a recounting of the Biblical story of the fall of man. He says, "Only the tree of the knowledge of good and evil was man not allowed to eat-lest the knowledge should enter the world and bring grief along with it: the pain of want and the dubious happiness of possession, the terror of separation and the difficulty of separation, the disquietude of deliberation and the worry of deliberation, the distress of choice and the decision of choice, the judgment of perdition and the anxiety of perdition, the suffering of death and the expectation of death." Man broke the peace by plucking the forbidden fruit of the knowledge of good and evil and the Garden of Eden was closed. How will the single individual find out where the good is and where the perfect is? Kiekegaard says doubt will explain it to him.

Kierkegaard compares the human love of fathers to God the Father's love. Here he speaks of the "terrible upheaval" where God pronounces judgment on the father, possibly Kierkegaard's father, Michael. Kierkegaard reasons this way, ""If God's love does not know how to give good gifts any better than a father's love, then there certainly is small comfort in these words. In this way the words became for him what fatherly love was for him-a beautiful, hallowed, wistful recollection, an uplifting mood that quickened in his soul the conception of the best in the human being but also of the human being's weakness, quickened the soul's most blessed longing but also retracted it again in order to subordinate it to the sadness of concern." Once doubt is planted, Kierkegaard says, "then doubt became stronger. What he himself had discerned, what he himself had experienced, what he with sympathetic concern and to his own grief had become convinced of-that earthly life is vanity, that even people's good gifts are weak-willed and only fill him with disgust-this he now found to be confirmed in Scripture also. Thus it was now plain and clear to him that this is what the words meant, and that far from supporting the most beautiful in life and letting it continue, they on the contrary tacitly condemned it and allowed it to disappear." Was Kierkegaard's father a good and perfect gift or not? Later, in Stages on Life's Way, Kierkegaard explored Solomon's relation to David and asked the same question. Was David a good and perfect gift to Solomon?

Kierkegaard says there is a "condition" that makes a gift good and perfect. He explored various conditions necessary for an individual to enjoy life in Either/Or Part II. He says, "Every human being, no matter how slightly gifted he is, however subordinate his position in life may be, has a natural need to formulate a life-view, a conception of the meaning of life and of its purpose." But the condition necessary for the enjoyment of life (health and beauty, power such as Nero had, the esthetic enjoyments of life, "every life-view that has the condition outside itself is despair." Either/Or was an "attempt to actualize an ethical life-view." This "condition" doesn't come from externalities according to Kierkegaard. He says,

Kierkegaard believed the religious discourse should be used to convince the single individual to not only find the good but also try to become good oneself.

What is the "one thing needful" that knowledge can't bring? Kierkegaard answers thus:

And repeats the same answer in 1846;

And again in 1850;

Every Good Gift and Every Perfect Gift Is from Above 
This discourse continues using another text from The Epistle of James and he adds a verse from the Book of Jude to explain what he wants to talk about here.

This point of view would break down the barriers between people. But Kierkegaard suggests that this breaking down of the barriers requires battles and victories. He says, "In the hallowed places, in every upbuilding view of life, the thought arises in a person's soul that help him to fight the good fight with flesh and blood, with principalities and powers, and in the fight to free himself for equality before God, whether this battle is more a war of aggression against the differences that want to encumber him with worldly favoritism or a defensive war against the differences that want to make him anxious in worldly perdition. This fight is a fight to unite the "two great classes" who are being obligated "to give or being obliged to receive." Kierkegaard says, "Every human being, whether he gives or receives, essentially has to thank God." These gifts can be a simple word of encouragement, a truth, money etc., but Kierkegaard warns those who "sit and brood like dragons on their earthly treasures, they hoard, like a miser, the good things of the spirit, jealous of them-of what benefit is it to him that the words wanted to teach him to bestow them in the right way?

To Gain One's Soul in Patience 
Kierkegaard's final discourse is about the philosophical questions concerning the soul. He keeps using the Socratic method.  This time he asks, "Is it saying too little to say that a person comes naked into the world and possesses nothing in the world if he does not even possess his soul? (…) What is there to live for if a person has to spend his whole life gaining the presupposition that on the deepest level is life's presupposition-yes, what does that mean? He had already asked himself about the soul in Either/Or in this way:

Kierkegaard proposes that the world possesses the individual soul, but the world is imperfect. God is perfect. Therefore there is a battle going on and duties to carry out. He describes the battle this way, "In patience, the soul comes to terms with all its possessors, with the life of the world in that it sufferingly gains itself from it, with God in that it sufferingly accepts itself from him, with itself in that it itself retains what it simultaneously gives to both without anyone being able to deprive the soul of it-patience. The soul can obtain nothing through power; it is in the hands of an alien power. If the soul were free in some other way, it would not be the self-contradiction in the contradiction between the external and the internal, the temporal and the eternal.(…)  This self-contradiction is again expressed in the soul's being stronger than the world through its weakness, in its being weaker than God through its strength, in its inability to gain anything but itself unless it wants to be deceived, and in its being able to gain itself only by losing itself. To know what a human soul is still a long way from beginning to gain one's soul in patience, and it is a knowledge that exhibits its difference from that gaining inasmuch as it does indeed grow in impatience. And even though this knowledge may have its significance, it often deceived a person the very same way the world does, in that he thought that he possessed it, whereas it was his knowledge that possessed him."

The knowledge that is the highest knowledge as far as Kierkegaard is concerned is the knowledge that he had a soul that could relate to God. This was "the one thing needful" He says, "His soul belongs to the world as its illegitimate possession; it belongs to God as his legitimate possession; it belongs to the person himself as his possession, as a possession that is to be gained. Consequently he gains-if he actually does gain-his soul from God, away from the world, through himself." The fight for the soul takes place in the inner being, not in externalities where everything changes from one moment to the next, it is a "work of patience". Here was Kierkegaard's Either/Or; either the single individual gains his soul from the world and presents it to God at the end of life or he loses his soul to the world and has nothing to present to God at the end of life. Kierkegaard puts it this way in August 1844:

How can a person come to know that a soul resides in them and that another has claim to it? Classical knowledge realized that experience alone doesn't lead one to the truth, but Hegel was interested in making Reason the only path to truth. Kierkegaard disagreed. He said, "A person knows his soul, then, if he truly knows it as something that he may be able t o describe accurately but that is in the possession of another and that he probably desires to possess, but knowledge as such does not help him in this. Even though patience is required for this knowing, as for any other, this nevertheless is not what the words speak about, as is shown in this-that in knowledge patience is not simultaneously the condition and the conditioned. (…) The person who wants to gain his soul in patience knows that his soul does not belong to him, that there is a power from which he must gain it, a power by whom he must gain it, and that he must gain it himself." The soul is in the hands of an alien power, the world, and the single individual must gain the soul from the world in order to present it to God unblemished.

Criticism 
Both Two Upbuilding Discourses and Four Upbuilding Discourses, 1843 were reviewed by Jacob Peter Mynster, Bishop of Zeeland. He considered the discourse about Job a sermon. The sales of the discourses were meager. It's generally accepted among scholars that Kierkegaard became a religious writer in 1847, with the publication of Edifying Discourses in Diverse Spirits An article written in 1855 didn't acknowledge any of these discourses of 1843 or 1844.

Kierkegaard's idea of the battle for the soul reminds one of John Bunyan's book, The Holy War Made by King Shaddai Upon Diabolus, to Regain the Metropolis of the World, Or, The Losing and Taking Again of the Town of Mansoul and the longing for the knowledge that knowledge can not bring reminds one of The Pilgrim's Regress by C.S. Lewis. His book is very similar to Bunyan's earlier book The Pilgrim's Progress John is looking for the Landlord (God) and reason is his guide. "Reason – 'The Spirit of the Age (Zeitgeist) wishes to allow argument and not to allow argument. … If anyone argues with them they say that he is rationalizing his own desires, and therefore need not be answered. But if anyone listens to them they will then argue themselves to show that their own doctrines are true. … You must ask them whether any reasoning is valid or not. If they say no, then their own doctrines, being reached by reasoning, fall to the ground. If they say yes, then they will have to examine your arguments and refute them on their merits: for if some reasoning is valid, for all they know, your bit of reasoning may be one of the valid bits." Kierkegaard had just gone through an argument with the spirit of the age in Repetition. In 1848 Kierkegaard wrote in his diary:

Kierkegaard described his longing for God, for that "one thing he needed" for his happiness, in Fear and Trembling. He said,

And he wrote the following in the discourse he published on the same date as Fear and Trembling. People lose themselves in externalities.

 
This kind of longing was repeated by Leo Tolstoy in his Confessions. He said,

George Brandes introduced both Søren Kierkegaard and Friedrich Nietzsche to the English speaking world. He recognized Kierkegaard's intention and contrasted it to Nietzsche in the quote provided.

	
Brandes also compared Kierkegaard to Henrik Ibsen. He said "As friendship under certain circumstances may be a hindrance to the independence of the individual, so too may marriage. Therefore it is that Nora refuses to consider her duties toward her husband and children as her most sacred duties; for a far more sacred duty she believes she owes herself. Therefore it is that to Helmer's "You are before all else a wife and mother"; she replies : — " I am before all else a human being, — or, at all events, I shall endeavor to become one." Ibsen shares with Kierkegaard the conviction that in every single human being there slumbers the soul of a warrior, an invincible power; but he cherishes it in another form than Kierkegaard, for whom the worth of the individual is something supernatural, while with Ibsen, we rest on human grounds. He believes that the individuality of the human being is to be preserved for its own sake, not for the sake of higher powers; and since beyond all else the individual should remain free and whole, all concessions made to the world represent to Ibsen the foul fiend, the evil principle. Eminent authors of the 19th century. Literary portraits, Henrik Ibsen, By George Brandes 1886 p. 433

David F. Swenson translated all eighteen discourses in the early 1940s. He wrote the following in his introduction to this discourse.

Theodor Haecker wrote in 1938, "Kierkegaard fought the fight victoriously. His was a good spirit and in him was love. Because of this victory one can forget his great error and defect; nor were they of an absolute order, but the result of his whole character and origin. He had the merits of his defects, and his errors were those of his truths, for he had not the teaching authority of the Church, but only his conscience, to which he was always faithful. On his death-bed he spoke of his fight in his own particular way, with humour and pathos; he said that all his work and all his toil had had as aim and end to sit astride a cloud and sing Alleluja, Alleluja, Alleluja to the glory of God. According to Hoffding, Kierkegaard taught us never to lose courage, whatever the difficulties. That only turns Kierkegaard's thought into a wretched banality; it is an appalling platitude and completely misses the point. It is tantamount to Carlyle's 'work and don't despair!' a saying that would have made Kierkegaard despair at once. His motto was the Benedictine motto Ora et labora (pray and work), so that he could say 'my genius is my prayer'. Nor was it merely a matter of holding out until one day all would be over, but of enduring and bearing it because it never ceases: because there is eternity: eternal blessedness or eternal despair. And as a result of his great struggles he received that precious acquisition, the belief that God is love. Even if he had never said so, although in fact he does, it is clear which was his favorite text, for it was the subject of nearly all his discourses and he was for ever paraphrasing it. Little wonder then, that it was this verse from the Epistle of S. James: 'Every good gift and every perfect gift is from above, and cometh down from the Father of lights with whom is no variableness, neither shadow of turning."

Robert L. Perkins and George Pattison have each written books about these discourses. Pattison says, "Every Good and Perfect Gift, it is the transformation that occurs when we realize that God is the giver of every good and perfect gift in such a way that whether our life flows smoothly and uninterruptedly forward, or whether we are wronged, tried and tested in adversities and temptations, all that we have and all that we are is a gift from God and therefore to be received with thankfulness and repentance; such an understanding if further exemplified in Job, presented in the discourses as a 'correction' to the defiant portrait of Job founded in Repetition, who, in the face of utter loss does not lose his mind in troubling himself over the various secondary causes that brought about this loss." Both books are below in Secondary sources.

Kierkegaard presented religion, especially Christianity, very primitively in this discourse. He dedicated all of his discourses to his father and began each one with a dedication to the "single individual". Here is his dedication from this discourse:

Notes

References

Sources

Primary sources 
 The Lord Gave and The Lord Hath Taken Away, Blessed Be the Name of the Lord Swenson translation
 Either/Or Volume I Edited by Victor Eremita, February 20, 1843, translated by David F. Swenson and Lillian Marvin Swenson Princeton University Press 1971
 Either/Or. Part II Translated by Howard and Edna Hong. Princeton, 1988, 
 Edifying Discourses, by Søren Kierkegaard, Vol. II, Translated from the Danish by David F. Swenson and Lillian Marvin Swenson, Augsburg Publishing House, Minneapolis, Minnesota, 1944
 Eighteen Upbuilding Discourses, by Søren Kierkegaard, Princeton University Press. Hong, 1990
 Fear and Trembling; Copyright 1843 Søren Kierkegaard – Kierkegaard's Writings; 6 – copyright 1983 – Howard V. Hong
 Repetition, A Venture in Experimental Psychology, by Constantin Constantius, October 16, 1843, by Søren Kierkegaard, Edited and Translated by Howard V. Hong and Edna H. Hong, 1983, Princeton University Press
 Concluding Unscientific Postscript to Philosophical Fragments Volume I, by Johannes Climacus, edited by Søren Kierkegaard, Copyright 1846 – Edited and Translated by Howard V. Hong and Edna H. Hong 1992 Princeton University Press
 The Point of View of My Work as An Author: A Report to History, by Søren Kierkegaard, written in 1848, published in 1859 by his brother Peter Kierkegaard Translated with introduction and notes by Walter Lowrie, 1962 Harper Torchbooks
 Evangelical Christendom: Christian Work and the News of the Churches, Published by J.S. Phillips etc. 1855 p. 127-128

Secondary sources 
 Eminent authors of the 19th century. Literary portraits, By George Brandes, Published 1886 by T. Y. Crowell & Co. in New York - He has numerous references to Kierkegaard throughout this book
 Friedrich Nietzsche, by George Brandes; translated from the Danish by A.G. Chater, Published 1914 by W. Heinemann in London, This early work of Brandes is also full of references to Kierkegaard
 Kierkegaard's Upbuilding Discourses: philosophy, theology, literature, By George Pattison. Psychology Press, 2002
 Eighteen Upbuilding Discourses, Søren Kierkegaard, by, Robert L. Perkins, Mercer University Press, 2003

External links
 

Books by Søren Kierkegaard
1843 books